The Centre is the name of a shopping centre in Livingston, Scotland. Formerly known as 'Livingston Regional Centre' before becoming the more widely recognised 'Almondvale Shopping Centre'. It is (as of 2019) the 28th largest shopping centre in the UK.

Origins
The original centre was built in the 1970s by the now defunct Livingston Development Corporation or LDC and was home to smaller independent retailers such as Virgo a fashion store and Coda music up to the larger well known brand names such as WoolCo (which became the now defunct Woolworths) and FineFare (the equally defunct Gateway). The shopping centre was very dark and gave the appearances of an outside mall except it was roofed.

Through time modernizations were made to make it more appealing to shoppers and more upmarket, bringing in more up to date floor tiling, bright lighting and the centres' branding and logos on the walls.

Phase Two
It was decided that a second phase would be built onto the existing frontage of the centre and would incorporate a purpose-built supermarket and feature two twin towers one on the front entrance elevation and the other on the side entrance where the new supermarket would be. Phase two opened in 1995 and had bigger well known names such as Iceland, Vodafone and Boots to name but a few.

Phase Three
The latest extension to the centre in 2008 sees a whole new concept for the now 30-year-old centre, the new addon which was code named The Elements tied in what would be seen as many different elements to give the illusion and overall feel of being outside but yet still being indoors. To achieve this they built a very high glass roof to cover a very widened pathway which felt like a shopping precinct with grey slate like tiles to finish off the effect.

The Elements opened in 2008 and is home to names such as River Island, Next and Marks & Spencer.

The Zones
The Centre is made up of 3 zones:-

 Almondvale Walk (the original 1970s phase one of the shopping centre),
 Almondvale Place (phase two which opened in 1995 and featured the two twin towers at each side of the building)
 Elements Square, the Wintergarden and The Avenue (phase three or The Elements which was opened in 2008).
 
The Centre is beside Livingston Designer Outlet (formerly McArthur Glen Livingston).

Anchor stores
The Centre contains two anchor stores - Marks & Spencer, Primark - as well as many other smaller retail units, and the new mall - named Elements Square - has a transparent ETFE roof covering its four shopping avenues.  There is also an internal civic space known as the Wintergarden.

Other stores
Stores include: Marks & Spencer, H.M.V., Waterstone's, H&M, Primark, Asda, WHSmith, New Look, and Schuh

Ownership transfer
In December 2014, The Centre's owners 'Land Securities' sold the shopping centre and associated retail parks to an investment firm 'HSBC Investments' marking the end of 30 plus years of ownership by the London-based management firm.

References

External links
The Centre website

Shopping centres in Scotland
Livingston, West Lothian
Buildings and structures in West Lothian
Tourist attractions in West Lothian